Robert Jerome Gibe (August 10, 1928 – August 27, 2005) was an American competition swimmer who represented the United States at the 1948 Summer Olympics in London.  He swam for the gold medal-winning U.S. team in the preliminary heats of the men's 4×200-meter freestyle relay.  However, Gibe did not receive a medal because under the Olympic swimming rules in effect in 1948, relay swimmers who only competed for winning teams in the preliminary heats were not eligible.

See also
 List of Wayne State University people

References

1928 births
2005 deaths
American male freestyle swimmers
Olympic swimmers of the United States
Swimmers from Chicago
Swimmers at the 1948 Summer Olympics
Wayne State University alumni